In Northern Ireland before the Troubles ended, low-level petty crime was not as common as in the rest of Ireland or the UK.

Since the Good Friday Agreement was signed in 1998, there has been more low-level crimes being committed, although statistics show that some places in Northern Ireland (outside of Belfast) have some of the lowest crime rates in Western Europe.

Crime by type 
The type of crime committed in Northern Ireland varies although robbery, murder, racketeering, disorder, burglary, joyriding, terrorism and assault are the main types.

In recent times Tiger kidnapping has been used in robberies on banks, shops and post offices.

Murder 
Over the three years 2011–14, the homicide rate in Northern Ireland was 0.9 per 100,000 inhabitants per year. This is a similar figure to the UK average, the murder rate in the Republic of Ireland, and most Western European nations, a region which has among the lowest homicide rates globally.

During The Troubles, homicide rates were considerably higher: at their height in 1972 there were 479 deaths caused either by terrorism or Security Forces' action – around 31 per 100,000, similar to homicide rates in 2010s Colombia or South Africa. During the period 1976–1993, most years saw 60–100 deaths related to The Troubles, or around 4.0–6.5/100,000 per annum.

Although there are repeated terrorism-related attempts at murder, few succeed. Since the re-establishment of devolved government in 2007, two soldiers and one police officer were murdered in 2009, with a further police officer murdered in 2011. Other incidents have seen life-changing injuries to police officers caused by explosions.

Terrorism 
Since the historic signing of the Good Friday Agreement most large terrorist groups and some smaller ones have since decommissioned their weapons or ceased military operations.  These groups include the Provisional Irish Republican Army (PIRA), Ulster Volunteer Force, Loyalist Volunteer Force, Ulster Defence Association, Irish National Liberation Army.

Even though the larger organisations have decommissioned and are complying with the terms of the 1998 Agreement there is still on the Republican side so called "Dissident republicans" who oppose the Agreement. These elements are short of numbers but still pose a serious threat, the threat became clear in March 2009, when two Soldiers were killed in County Antrim while collecting a pizza just outside the barracks, the Real Irish Republican Army later claimed responsibility for the shooting.

Two days later another group called the Continuity IRA shot dead a police officer in Craigavon, County Armagh. The officer was responding to a call from a lady in the area when he was shot in the back of the head by a sniper.

More recently a large number of bombs have been discovered in counties Londonderry, Armagh and Tyrone. Although none of the devices detonated the police and British Army said they were getting more "sophisticated", for instance in February 2008 the Army defused a 100 lb device in County Down, then in September 2009 a 600 lb device was made safe. These groups do not have the same support as PIRA once had, nor the same weaponry but they are still capable of murder and bombings.

On Friday 16 October 2009, at around 07:30 BST a car bomb exploded under the car of a police officer's wife in the large Unionist area of east Belfast and what is considered to be an area controlled by the Ulster Defence Association. The device was intended to kill her husband whom she usually drives to work but was not present in the car at the time. The woman escaped with minor injuries as the bomb detonated under the passenger side seat. The Real IRA claimed responsibility for this incident.

Bomb alerts 
Between 2007 and 2009, there were on average in Northern Ireland around seven or more Hoax Bomb Alerts each week, but some alerts are genuine. They are so common that there is a permanent Bomb Disposal team of the British Army stationed in Northern Ireland. The main areas are County Londonderry, County Down, County Antrim and Belfast.

Due to the threat posed to the society in Northern Ireland, all objects have to be treated with suspect care and controlled explosions are commonplace in some areas.

On 14 October 2009, the Police Service of Northern Ireland got a call stating that a 600 lb bomb had been left in a van abandoned on a bridge in a village in County Tyrone. The Army carried out a controlled explosion on the device which turned out to be a hoax.

A British newspaper recently published an article that said, "Republican bomb alerts total 750 in two years" which is an average of 7.21 a week or just over one a day.

Intimidation of Roma 
With new countries joining the European Union and the freedom of movement of people within the union, there has been an influx of people from countries such as, Lithuania, Poland, Romania, and surrounding countries.

In June 2009, around 100 Roma gypsies from Romania had to be moved to safer houses because their windows had been smashed and racist graffiti dubbed on their houses in a Loyalist area of south Belfast.

Theft 
The theft of Automated Teller Machines (ATMs) in recent years is on the rise. It is not known whether the paramilitary groups are the main perpetrators or just organised crime groups. The theft of such a machine in Northern Ireland involves pulling the ATM from the wall, usually with a large digger, then putting it in a waiting vehicle (usually a dump truck).

The BBC reported on 21 October 2009 that three such incidents had occurred in one week, all involving a digger.

In November 2009 after a 'smash and grab' incident in Dungannon, County Tyrone the Irish News newspaper released an article that revealed that there had been 13 such incidents since March 2009 in Northern Ireland.

References